Thomas Morgan Fine (October 10, 1914 – January 10, 2005) was an American pitcher in Major League Baseball who played in 23 games for the Boston Red Sox and St. Louis Browns. He was a switch-hitter and threw right-handed.

Despite pitching just two seasons in the major leagues, Fine was a professional baseball pitcher for 15 years (1939–1942; 1946–1956). He is most remembered for his career in Cuban baseball during five seasons, and especially for being the only pitcher ever to hurl a no-hitter game in Caribbean World Series history.

Professional career
Fine played for the Scranton Red Sox of the Eastern League, where in 1946 he broke the leagues record for most consecutive wins with 15.

He made his major league debut in 1947 with the Red Sox and finished with a 1–2 record in seven starts. He appeared in the majors again in 1950 with the Browns and posted 0–1 in 14 games as a reliever.

In his majors career, Fine compiled a 1–3 record and a 6.81 earned run average, walking 44 batters while striking out 16 in 72⅔ innings of work. He was a competent hitting pitcher, batting .333 (6-for-18) with five runs scored and one RBI in 25 games.

In the minors, he went 157–110 with a 3.35 ERA for 12 different teams during 15 seasons spanning 1939–1956.

Career highlight
On February 21, 1952, Fine appeared in the III Caribbean World Series held at Panama. He was called by Leones del Habana manager Mike González as a late replacement for future Hall of Famer Hoyt Wilhelm.

Guided by catcher Andrés Fleitas, Fine posted the only no-hitter pitched in any Caribbean series game, to give his team a 1–0 win against the Cervecería Caracas of Venezuela. He also helped himself, going 1 for 3 while scoring the eventual winning run on Sandy Amorós' single in the 6th inning. Hard-luck losing pitcher Al Papai allowed just four singles.

Five days later, Fine faced the Carta Vieja Yankees of Panama and was close to glory. He was three outs from consecutive no-hitters in the Series, having allowed a single in the ninth inning to break it up. His 17 hitless innings streak also is the longest in Series history.

Personal life
Fine served in the United States Army Air Forces during World War II. Following his baseball retirement, he became a respected businessman and also served as a deacon in the Baptist church. 
 
He died in 2005 in Little Elm, Texas, at the age of 90.

References

External links

1952 Caribbean World Series (Spanish)
Historic Baseball – Obituary
Venezuelan Professional Baseball League statistics

1914 births
2005 deaths
United States Army Air Forces personnel of World War II
Baltimore Orioles (IL) players
Baseball players from Texas
Boston Red Sox players
Canton Terriers players
Greensboro Red Sox players
Leones del Caracas players
American expatriate baseball players in Venezuela
Major League Baseball pitchers
Memphis Chickasaws players
Oneonta Indians players
People from Cleburne, Texas
Richmond Virginians (minor league) players
Rocky Mount Red Sox players
St. Louis Browns players
San Antonio Missions players
San Francisco Seals (baseball) players
Scranton Red Sox players
Shreveport Sports players
Toronto Maple Leafs (International League) players
American expatriate baseball players in Cuba